Alice in Wonderland is the second EP from visual kei rock band Alice Nine. It was released on the July 27, 2005. Includes 5 tracks.

Track listing 
 "Siva&Diva" – 4:01
  – 4:41
  – 5:59
  – 4:04
  – 5:03

Notes
Alice in Wonderland was re-released later in 2005.
The first pressings came with a special packaging.
The title of the fifth track, "Heisei Juushichinen Shichigatsu Nanoka," corresponds to the date of July 7 of the seventeenth year of Japan's Heisei era, or 2005.
The backwards "R" in the title was an idea put forth by the rhythm guitarist, Tora, from his love of the American band KoЯn.

References

Alice Nine albums
2005 EPs